L'Être et l'Événement is a philosophy book by Alain Badiou, published in January 1988 by Éditions du Seuil.

References

Philosophy books
1988 non-fiction books